Michael Seth Gelman (born August 4, 1961) is the executive producer of Live with Kelly and Ryan. He also occasionally takes small roles on television, appearing in two episodes of Kelly Ripa's ABC sitcom Hope and Faith. He also has a Guinness World Record for the most morning talk show episodes produced by the same producer.

Early life and career
Gelman was born in Manhattan in a Jewish family, and lived in Queens, in New Jersey and through grades 1-6 in the Long Island town of Dix Hills, New York before moving to the Chicago suburb of Highland Park, Illinois. After high school he moved to Melville, Long Island, New York. While earning a degree in broadcast production management from the University of Colorado School of Journalism, Gelman worked for the U.S. Ski Association covering pre-Olympic trials all over the country as a cameraman, field producer and editor.  Gelman's most important internship came during the summer of his junior year at WABC-TV in New York, the station that would later produce Live! with Kelly and Ryan. In the 1980s he became a production assistant on Regis Philbin's local talk show, The Morning Show. Gelman worked his way to Executive Producer on The Morning Show which would eventually become Live!.

Personal life
In 2000, he married Laurie Hibberd, a television personality from Canada who also worked in morning television as the co-host of FX's Breakfast Time with Tom Bergeron.  They have two daughters, Jamie and Misha, and live in Manhattan.

References

External links

1961 births
Living people
American television producers
20th-century American Jews
21st-century American Jews